Annie Smith (born April 23, 1939) is an American athlete. She competed in the women's long jump at the 1960 Summer Olympics.

References

External links
 

1939 births
Living people
Athletes (track and field) at the 1960 Summer Olympics
American female long jumpers
Olympic track and field athletes of the United States
Athletes (track and field) at the 1959 Pan American Games
Pan American Games gold medalists for the United States
Pan American Games medalists in athletics (track and field)
Track and field athletes from Atlanta
Tennessee State Lady Tigers track and field athletes
Medalists at the 1959 Pan American Games